Lucca Allen (born 29 June 2002) is an Irish racing driver. He is the current champion of the Formula 4 South East Asia Championship and is competing in the Le Mans Cup with  Graff Racing.

Career

Karting
Born in Cork, Allen started his karting career in 2011. He quickly proved his speed, competing for Ireland in the Karting World Championship in 2014 against the likes of Enaam Ahmed and Mick Schumacher. Allen once again raced for Ireland in the Karting World Championship in 2016, a year in which he also became Irish Karting Champion.

Lower formulae 
In 2017 Allen made his car racing debut for Falcon Motorsport in the F4 British Championship. He started in 15 races and scored no points. Despite this, the Irish driver signed on with Fortec Motorsports to compete full-time in 2018. Allen scored 29 points and finished 14th in the championship, whilst also making his F4 SEA Championship debut, scoring one podium in Sepang.

Allen fully committed to the F4 SEA Championship in 2019. Allen won the championship by one point to Finnish driver Elias Seppänen, with 640 points and twelve race victories to his name.

Super Formula Lights
In January 2020 ALBIREX Racing announced that Allen would take part in the inaugural season of the Japanese Super Formula Lights series. However, due to COVID-19 travel restrictions Allen was unable to compete in the first three rounds of the championship at Motegi, Okayama and Sportsland SUGO. The Irishman made his series debut at Autopolis and scored a total of five points, helping him to finish 9th in the drivers' championship.

Endurance racing 
In 2022 Allen made his first foray into endurance racing. Having originally been scheduled to drive for AF2 Motorsport in the Michelin Le Mans Cup, Allen ended up competing in the Ultimate Cup Series for Graff Racing, racing in the Prototype Challenge. The Irishman won the championship in convincing fashion, having won five out of six races.

Racing record

Career summary

Complete F4 British Championship results
(key) (Races in bold indicate pole position) (Races in italics indicate fastest lap)

Complete F4 SEA Championship results 
(key) (Races in bold indicate pole position) (Races in italics indicate fastest lap)

Complete FIA Motorsport Games results

Complete Super Formula Lights results 
(key) (Races in bold indicate pole position) (Races in italics indicate fastest lap)

† Driver did not finish the race, but was classified as he completed over 90% of the race distance.

Complete Formula Regional Japanese Championship results 
(key) (Races in bold indicate pole position) (Races in italics indicate fastest lap)

References

External links
 

2002 births
Living people
Sportspeople from Cork (city)
Irish racing drivers
Irish people of Icelandic descent
British F4 Championship drivers
FIA Motorsport Games drivers
Formula Regional Japanese Championship drivers
Team Meritus drivers
Fortec Motorsport drivers
Le Mans Cup drivers
Graff Racing drivers
Karting World Championship drivers